Maung Maung Soe may refer to:

 Maung Maung Soe (born 1951), Burmese politician.
 Maung Maung Soe (footballer) (born 1995), Burmese footballer.
 Maung Maung Soe (general), Burmese military commander.